Drebin is a surname. Notable people with the surname include:

 Frank Drebin, a fictional police officer played by Leslie Nielsen
 Drebin, a fictional arms dealer in the Metal Gear franchise